Two ships of the Imperial Japanese Navy were named Itsukushima:

 , a  launched in 1889 and scrapped in 1926
 , a minelayer launched in 1929 and sunk in 1944

Imperial Japanese Navy ship names
Japanese Navy ship names